This is a list of American television-related events in 1957.

Events

Television programs

Debuts

Ending this year

Television stations

Station launches

Network affiliation changes

Station closures

Births

Deaths

References

External links 
List of 1957 American television series at IMDb